St. Paul's Church, George Street, was a Church of England church built as a chapel of ease to St. Mary's Church, Nottingham. It was opened in 1822 and closed in 1924.

Background

It was consecrated by Edward Venables-Vernon-Harcourt the Archbishop of York on 24 October 1822, and the patron of the living was Charles Pierrepont, 2nd Earl Manvers. The architect was William Wilkins, the brother of the Vicar of St. Mary's, Revd. George Wilkins, and the cost was £14,026 (equivalent to £ in ).

It was a Commissioners' church. Revd. Wilkins formally applied for a grant in November 1818, but it was not until September 1821 that the money was approved and construction work started.

It had a fine Doric portico with a bell turret over it. The roof of the church was supported by 14 Corinthian columns and pilasters at the angles.

At the time of the building of this 'St. Paul's Chapel of Ease', as it was then called, public opinion was running high against King George IV for he had refused to allow his wife Caroline to be crowned, notwithstanding this, the King's Coronation was celebrated in Nottingham by the firing of several volleys in the Market Place by the 7th Dragoon Guards, and the Yeomanry Cavalry. The Mayor then invited the officers to join him in drinking his Majesty's health and afterwards the foundation stone was laid by the Revd. George Wilkins, Vicar of St. Mary's Church.

Originally opened as a Chapel of Ease, it became an independent parish in 1838.

Incumbents
1839 Charles Armstrong
1868 James Hill   
1880 James Farmer  
1892 Alfred Whymper (formerly vicar of St James' Church, Standard Hill)
1896 George Bishop
1906 Henry Biddel (formerly vicar of St Christopher's Church, Sneinton)  
1918 Ernest Harold Perkins (formerly curate at St. John the Baptist's Church, Leenside, Nottingham)

Organ

The church organ was built by Bevington and Sons of London in 1846 for a cost of £310 (equivalent to £ in ).

Organists
John M. Wilson 1846 - 1848 (afterwards organist at St Barnabas Catholic Church, Nottingham)
C.N. Wright ca. 1853 (afterwards organist of Holy Trinity Church, Trinity Square
Mr. Myers 1862 - 1868  (formerly organist of St Mark's Church, Nottingham)
G. H. Woodhouse 1878 - 1883  (afterwards organist of All Saints' Church, Nottingham)

Closure

With the population of Nottingham moving out into the suburbs at during the early part of the 20th century, the church became redundant and was closed in 1924. The proceeds from the sale of the site were given by the Diocese of Southwell to the construction of the new building at St. Cyprian's Church, Sneinton.

References

Former Church of England church buildings
Nottingham St Paul
Demolished buildings and structures in Nottingham
Nottingham St Paul
Nottingham